Karnal Sher Kallay is a Union Council of the Swabi District in Khyber Pakhtunkhwa.

District Swabi has 4 Tehsils, i.e., Swabi, Lahor, Topi and Razar. Each Tehsil comprises certain numbers of union councils. There are 56 union councils in district Swabi.

See also 
Swabi District

External links
Khyber-Pakhtunkhwa Government website section on Lower Dir
United Nations
 HAJJ website Uploads
PBS paiman.jsi.com

Populated places in Swabi District
Union councils of Khyber Pakhtunkhwa
Union Councils of Swabi District